The Americas Zone was one of three zones of regional competition in the 2009 Fed Cup.

Group I
Venue: Uniprix Stadium, Montreal, Canada (indoor hard)
Date: 4–7 February

The six teams were divided into two pools of three teams. The top team of each pool played against one other to decide which nation progresses to the World Group II Play-offs. The four nations that came either second or third in each pool then played-off to determine which two teams would be relegated down to Group II for 2010.

Pools

Play-offs

  advanced to 2009 World Group II Play-offs.

Group II
Venue: Parque del Este, Santo Domingo, Dominican Republic (outdoor hard)
Date: 21–25 April

The nine teams were divided into one pool of four teams and one pool of five. The top two teams of each pool played-off against each other to decide which two nations progress to the Group I.

Pools

  and  advanced to Group I for 2010.

See also
Fed Cup structure

References

 Fed Cup Profile, Brazil
 Fed Cup Profile, Canada
 Fed Cup Profile, Colombia
 Fed Cup Profile, Panama
 Fed Cup Profile, Bolivia
 Fed Cup Profile, Chile
 Fed Cup Profile, Cuba
 Fed Cup Profile, Peru
 Fed Cup Profile, Dominican Republic
 Fed Cup Profile, Puerto Rico
 Fed Cup Profile, Guatemala

External links
 Fed Cup website

 
Americas